Slaver may refer to:

Slaver, an entity engaged in slavery, such as a:
Slave ship
Slave trade participant, such as a slave trader or slaveowner
Slaver, i.e., saliva, either the result or act of drooling as opposed to normal salivation
Slavers (1978), a film directed by Jürgen Goslar
Slavers (Dungeons & Dragons), an adventure module for Dungeons & Dragons

See also 
 Slave (disambiguation)